Margarete Weißkirchner (1460-1500), was the common-law-spouse of Philip I, Count of Hanau-Münzenberg from 1477 until their death in 1500.  They openly lived together after the death of Philip's spouse in 1477. They could not marry, because she was a commoner. Margaret was not considered Philip's royal mistress, but was treated as if though they were married.

He appeared with her in public. The most representative testimony is probably the first large-scale double-portrait in art history, the so-called Gotha Lovers. Their relationship is exceptionally well documented. The couple had three children:
 Elsa of Hanau, married around 1508 with Heinrich Rabe.
 John of Hanau-Münzenberg, a priest in Ober-Roden.
 Anne of Hanau, married in 1517 with Dietz Reuter, a publican at Ortenberg.
These children could not inherit the county, because they did not belong to the high nobility. Nevertheless, Philip and Margareta included them in their will.

References

 Johann Adam Bernhard: Acta & Historiae der Hern und Grafen von Hanau. [Handschrift des 18. Jahrhunderts im Staatsarchiv Marburg: H 146]

1460 births
1500 deaths
Morganatic spouses of German royalty
15th-century German people